The 2016 European 10 m Events Championships were held in Audi Aréna, Győr, Hungary from February 22 to 28, 2016.

Men's events

Women's events

Mixed events

Men's Junior events

Women's Junior events

Mixed Junior events

Medal table

See also
 European Shooting Confederation
 International Shooting Sport Federation
 List of medalists at the European Shooting Championships
 List of medalists at the European Shotgun Championships

References

External links
 Official website

European Shooting Championships
European Shooting Championships
2016 European Shooting Championships
European 10 m Events Championships
Sport in Győr